Quarry Bay is an area beneath Mount Parker in the Eastern District of Hong Kong Island, in Hong Kong. The western portion of the area was also formerly known as Lai Chi. Traditionally an industrial and residential area, the number of commercial buildings in this district has increased since the 1990s.

Quarry Bay is bordered by Sai Wan Ho to the east, Mount Parker to the south, North Point to the west, and Victoria Harbour to the north. Administratively, it is part of Eastern District.

History

The 1819 edition of the Gazetteer of Sun On County did not mention today's Quarry Bay. Historians such as Anthony Kwok Kin Siu suggested Quarry Bay was a remote area before British colonial time.

During Colonial Hong Kong times, the Hakka stonemasons settled in the area after the British arrival.

This area was a bay where rock from the hillsides were quarried and transported by ship for building construction or road building. The Chinese name Tsak Yue Chung reveals that it was a small stream where crucian carp could be found in the 19th century. The English name was Arrow Fish Creek.

Taikoo
The eastern part of Quarry Bay, namely , was largely owned by Swire and therefore many places and facilities are named after the company's Chinese name, Taikoo. The upper course of the river was converted into a cement-paved catchwater, and the lower course is the present-day Quarry Bay Street, with the original estuary near the Quarry Bay Street - King's Road junction.

In the mid-1980s, the hillside was converted into Kornhill apartment buildings, the reservoir into  apartment buildings, and the Dockyard into Taikoo Shing. The Coca-Cola factory is now apartment Kornville, and Taikoo Sugar is now the Taikoo Place, a commercial hub.

Lai Chi
The western end of Quarry Bay was historically part of North Point; during the 1930s its beaches became one of the most popular places for holding swimming galas in Hong Kong. From this basis an upmarket entertainment complex, the Ritz Nightclub, was built in the area in 1947. The nightclub was demolished a few years later to make way for the construction of apartment buildings during the latter half of the 1950s. Nonetheless, for years afterwards, the western part of Quarry Bay continued to be known informally as Lai Chi, made more so by the name being homophone to Cantonese for "late as usual" - a reference to King's Road, until 1984 the only thoroughfare in the area and thus infamous for traffic congestion.

To this day, some buildings in the western part of Quarry Bay are named as "North Point something building", although they are across the modern-day limit of North Point at Man Hong Street / Healthy Street West.

Residential buildings

Bedford Gardens
CASA 880
Dragon View House
Granview Court
The Floridian
Healthy Village Estate
Kings View Court
Kornhill, and Kornhill Gardens
Model Housing Estate
Mount Parker Residences
 Nan Fung Sun Chuen
Novum East
Oceanic Building
The Orchards

Ritz Garden Apartments
Riviera Mansion
Royal Terrace
Snowboat Mansion
Splendid Place
Sunway Gardens
 Taikoo Shing
Wah Shun Garden

“Monster Building” - Fook Cheong Building, Montane Mansion, Oceanic Mansion, Yick Cheong Building and Yick Fat Building

Nan Fung Sun Chuen

Nan Fung Sun Chuen, built in 1978, is a private apartment estate. Consisting of 12 buildings distributed along Greig Road and Greig Crescent with a car park at the centre of the development, it was developed by Nan Fung Development. Because of the relatively large size of the development, it serves as the benchmark for premises developed in the late 1970s in the property market. The tower blocks range in height from 28 to 33 floors. Blocks 1 to 5 are at 32 to 40 (even numbers) Greig Road while blocks 6 to 12 are at 27 to 15 Greig Crescent.

Taikoo Shing

Taikoo Shing is a private residential development in Quarry Bay. Consisting of 61 mansions distributed along Taikoo Wan Road & Taikoo Shing Road, it was developed by Swire.

Tourism

Fireboat Alexander Grantham Exhibition Gallery 
The Alexander Grantham was a fireboat of Hong Kong's Fire Services Department. The fireboat was named after former Governor Sir Alexander Grantham. The boat has since retired from service and been replaced by other vessels.

On 10 March 2006, the fireboat was successfully hoisted into its new permanent home in the Central Concourse of Quarry Bay Park, Hong Kong, where it has been converted into the Fireboat Alexander Grantham Exhibition Gallery and was opened to the public as a museum in 2007. In addition to the fireboat itself, the Gallery houses a number of multimedia exhibits on the vessel's history and on firefighting in Hong Kong.

"Monster Building" complex 
"Monster Building" is a condominium complex of five interconnected buildings. The complex consists of Fook Cheong Building, Montane Mansion, Oceanic Mansion, Yick Cheong Building, and Yick Fat Building.

Woodside Biodiversity Education Centre 
 situated at Mount Parker Road, Quarry Bay. The centre comprises three themed exhibition galleries introducing Hong Kong's precious natural resources and biodiversity. The centre aims to foster public awareness, knowledge and understanding the inherent value of Hong Kong's biodiversity assets and to marshal public support and action for nature conservation.

Commercial buildings

Taikoo Place - including 
Devon House
Dorset House
PCCW Tower
Warwick House
Cornwall House
Lincoln House
Oxford House
Cambridge House
Berkshire House
Taikoo Place Apartment (hotel)
One Island East 
One Taikoo Place (Completed in 2018)
Two Taikoo Place (Completed in 2021)
Cityplaza
Cityplaza Phase 1
EAST, Hong Kong (hotel)
 Cityplaza Phase 2
Cityplaza Phase 3
Cityplaza Phase 4
1025 King's Road
1063 King's Road
Kerry Centre
Prosperity Millennia Plaza

A few industrial buildings exist in the areas of Shipyard Lane.

Former
Fresh Produce Market
 Gala I, Gala II cinemas
Mount Parker House 栢嘉商業大廈

Economy
The Kerry Properties head office is in Quarry Bay.

Government
The head office of the Securities and Futures Commission is in One Island East in Quarry Bay.

Parks and recreational facilities
Quarry Bay Park
Quarry Bay Municipal Services Building - with indoor playground and a public library managed by LSCD
Greig Road Sitting-out Area
Tai Tam Country Park (Quarry Bay Extension)

Education

Quarry Bay is in Primary One Admission (POA) School Net 14. Within the school net are multiple aided schools (operated independently but funded with government money) and North Point Government Primary School.

Kindergartens & Nurseries
ABC Pathways International Kindergarten (Tai Koo Campus)
Creativity (Park Vale) Kindergarten
Epoch Anglo-Chinese Kindergarten
Hamilton Hill International Kindergarten
MAGART International Kindergarten
Saint Anna Anglo-Chinese Kindergarten
Victoria (Kornhill) Kindergarten
Victoria (Kornhill) Nursery

Primary schools
Buddhist Chung Wah Kornhill Primary School
Canossa School (Hong Kong) 
Chinese Methodist School North Point
Delia School of Canada
North Point Government Primary School
Shanghai Alumni Primary School

Secondary schools
Canossa College
Delia School of Canada

Transport

Public transport
 MTR
 MTR Quarry Bay station: Tseung Kwan O line and Island line
 MTR Tai Koo station: Island line
 Trams
 First Bus
 Citybus
 KMB (serves only cross-harbour routes)
 Minibuses
 to Kornhill, Cyberport, North Point, Shau Kei Wan, Kennedy Town, etc.
 includes 32, 32A, 33 etc.

Major thoroughfares, roads and streets

Island Eastern Corridor
Eastern Harbour Crossing
Finnie Street
Greig Road
Java Road
King's Road
Kornhill Road
Mansion Lane
Model Lane
Mount Parker Road
Quarry Bay Street
Sai Wan Terrace
Shipyard Lane
Taikoo Shing Road
Taikoo Wan Road
 Tsat Tsz Mui Road
Tong Chong Street
Westlands Road

See also
 Conservation in Hong Kong
 Taikoo Shing
 :Category:Rivers of Hong Kong

References

 
Eastern District, Hong Kong